Malo Polje is a village in Perušić, Croatia. The 2011 population was 74.

References

Populated places in Lika-Senj County